Phương Dung (also known as Phan Phương Dung, born in 1946) is a popular Vietnamese country music singer from 1960 to 1970.

Early life 
Phương Dung was born in Gò Công Province (now Tiền Giang Province). She moved to Saigon when she finished primary school and attended secondary school from 1958 to 1959. She started her singing career around 1960.

Music career 
She rose to fame at the age of 17 after the success of the song "Nỗi buồn gác trọ" (by Hoai Linh and Manh Phat) in 1962, "Những đồi hoa sim" in 1964 (by Dzũng Chinh, who used a poem by Hữu Loan as lyrics), and "Tạ từ trong đêm" in 1965 (by Trần Thiện Thanh). Phương Dung was awarded the "Gold Award for Female Artists" in 1965, while Trần Thiện Thanh received the "Best Song of the Year Award".

Phuong Dung also was given the title of "Con Nhạn Trắng Gò Công" by Kien Giang poet Hà Huy Hà.

She has completed 45 successful tours for Vietnamese companies: Sóng Nhạc, Sơn Ca, and later Akai của các trung tâm Continental, Trường Hải, and Nhật Trường. Phuong Dung sings about love songs associated with wartime as seen in the songs: "The Sim flower hill" (Dzũng Chinh and Hữu Loan), "Nỗi buồn gác trọ" (Manh Phat and Hoai Linh), "Tạ từ trong đêm" (Tran Thien Thanh),  "Khúc hát ân tình" (Xuân Tiên và Y Vân), "Đố ai" (Phạm Duy), "Sương lạnh chiều đông" (Mạnh Phát), "Tím cả rừng chiều" (Thu Hồ), "Vọng gác đêm sương" (Mạnh Phát), "Cánh buồm chuyển bến" (Minh Kỳ), "The Winter Night's Sorrow" (Anh Minh), "Sắc hoa màu nhớ" (Nguyễn Văn Đông), "Biết đâu tìm" (Hoàng Thi Thơ), "Còn mãi những khúc tình ca" (Quốc Dũng).

Family and career
In 1968, she married and gave up her music career for motherhood, having eight children: six boys and two girls.

In 1977 the family moved to Australia and her daughters followed in her footsteps. Phuong Vy had worked with the Thuy Nga Center (as well as films like Romper Stomper), and Hoang Ly worked with Asia Entertainment before becoming a model.

Phuong Dung often participates in charity programs, especially relating to religious organizations. In recent years, she has returned to Vietnam to perform.

Phuong Dung has almost 400 albums to her credit, and many of her famous songs are still sung today by the new generation of singers.

In May 2014, Phuong Dung joined with Giao Linh to perform concerts, Sol Golden, as an anniversary of her music career. Around the end of 2014, Phuong Dung was invited as judge for the music competition Solo cùng Bolero and  continued on the talent  show into 2016.

Charity 
Phuong Dung established the charity "See The Light" which specializes in helping the poor in Vietnam by raising money to build houses, and schools. She also encouraged artists and her friends to participate in this program through art shows for charity in countries where there are larger Vietnamese populations.

From 1999, Phuong Dung went back to Vietnam to help raise funds to treat patients with eye damage. She started in Go Cong, then Tien Giang, where she was born, and then out into the areas of Quang Tri, Dong Hoi, Quang Nam, Kon Tum, Dong Thap, Can Tho. In addition to her work with eye treatment, she participated in charities to help poor students, as well as flood and disaster relief.

References

People from Tiền Giang province
1946 births
Living people
20th-century Vietnamese women singers
21st-century Vietnamese women